Favor Royal Demesne, also spelled Favour Royal, is a townland in County Tyrone, Northern Ireland. It is situated in the barony of Clogher and the civil parish of Errigal-Trough, adjacent to the Irish border.

In 1841 the population of the townland was 105 people (21 houses) and in 1851 it was 95 people (20 houses).

The townland is named after the demesne of Favour Royal, a manor granted to Sir Thomas Ridgeway in 1613. The demesne is listed on the Register of Parks, Gardens and Demesnes of Special Historic Interest, and the house, built in 1823 and currently derelict, is listed at grade B+. The townland also contains two scheduled historic monuments: both bivallate raths  (grid refs:  H6060 5290 and H6128 5215).

See also
List of townlands of County Tyrone
List of archaeological sites in County Tyrone

References

Townlands of County Tyrone
Archaeological sites in County Tyrone